Bienor may refer to:

Bienor (mythology), name of four characters in Greek mythology
54598 Bienor, an asteroid

See also
Bianor (disambiguation)